David Erie Nadler (born 1973) is an American mathematician who specializes in geometric representation theory and symplectic geometry.  He is currently a professor at the University of California, Berkeley.

Education and career
Nadler graduated from Brown University with a B.S. in mathematics in 1996.  He completed his doctoral studies at Princeton University under the supervision of Robert MacPherson, earning a Ph.D. in mathematics in 2001.  He worked as an instructor at the University of Chicago for several years before taking a tenure track position at Northwestern University in 2005, where he became a Full Professor in 2011.  He moved to his current position at the University of California at Berkeley in 2012.

Recognition

In 2007 Nadler was selected as a Sloan Research Fellow, and in 2013 he became a member of the inaugural class of Fellows of the American Mathematical Society.

Nadler delivered the Arf Lecture in 2012.

Selected works

References

External links
 David Erie Nadler at the Mathematics Genealogy Project
 David Nadler author profile at MathSciNet
 David Nadler author profile at zbMath
 David Nadler researcher profile at University of California, Berkeley

1973 births
Living people
21st-century American mathematicians
Brown University alumni
Princeton University alumni
Northwestern University faculty
University of California, Berkeley College of Letters and Science faculty
Fellows of the American Mathematical Society